The Vice-President of the Comoros was a political position in the Comoros. Vice-Presidents are appointed by the President. From 2002 to 2011, the Presidency and the positions of the two Vice-Presidents were rotated between the three Comoro Islands – Grande Comore, Anjouan and Mohéli. From 2011 to 2019, there were three Vice-Presidents, one from each of the islands in the Union of the Comoros. The positions of Vice-Presidents were abolished as part of the implementation of constitutional referendum held in 2018 in May 2019, instead designating a "main minister" and the governors of the islands as successors to become acting president.

List of officeholders

Notes

References

Government of the Comoros
Comoros
 
1976 establishments in the Comoros
1978 disestablishments in the Comoros
2002 establishments in the Comoros
2019 disestablishments in the Comoros